The Pink Panther Show is a showcase of animated shorts produced by David H. DePatie and Friz Freleng between 1969 and 1978, starring the animated Pink Panther character from the opening credits of the live-action films. The series was produced by Mirisch Films and DePatie–Freleng Enterprises, and was broadcast Saturday mornings on two American television networks: from September 6, 1969, to September 2, 1978, on NBC; and from September 9, 1978, to August 30, 1980, on ABC.

History

Format 
When The Pink Panther Show first aired in 1969, it consisted of one cartoon featuring The Inspector, sandwiched by two Pink Panther entries. Due to the number of shorts produced, two episodes feature a Pink Panther cartoon sandwiched by two Inspector entries. The 30-minute show was then connected via bumper sequences featuring both the panther and Inspector together, with announcer Marvin Miller acting as an off-camera narrator talking to the panther. Bumper sequences consisted of newly animated segments as well as recycled footage from existing cartoons We Give Pink Stamps, Reel Pink, Pink Outs and Super Pink, fitted with new incidental music and voice-over work from Miller.

Pink Panther shorts that were produced after 1969 (starting with A Fly in the Pink) were made for both broadcast and theatrical release, typically appearing on television first, and released to theaters by United Artists. A number of new series were created, including the very popular The Ant and the Aardvark, Tijuana Toads (a.k.a. Texas Toads), Hoot Kloot, Misterjaw, Roland and Rattfink, The Dogfather and two Tijuana Toads spinoffs: The Blue Racer and Crazylegs Crane. The New Pink Panther Show and later shows featured newly animated bumper segments involving the Panther, the Ant and the Aardvark, Misterjaw, and the Texas Toads.

By this time, due to the violent nature of some of the cartoons, they were re-edited for television by omitting the cartoon violent scenes from their broadcasts, in order to make them more family friendly.

In 1976, the half-hour series was revamped into a 90-minute format, as It's the All New Pink Panther Laugh-and-a-Half Hour-and-a-Half Show Introducing Misterjaw; this version included a live-action segment, where comedian Lenny Schultz would read letters and jokes from viewers. This version performed poorly and eventually reverted to the original 30-minute version in 1977 as Think Pink Panther.

After nine years on NBC, the Pink Panther moved to ABC in 1978 and was retitled The All New Pink Panther Show and Pink Panther Encore, where it lasted two seasons before leaving the network realm entirely. The tenth season featured 16 episodes with 32 new Pink Panther cartoons, and 16 featuring Crazylegs Crane: no bumpers were produced for The All New Pink Panther Show, but 10 second "Stay tuned..." bumpers explaining an upcoming entry were produced for the first several episodes. The 32 All New Pink Panther Show entries were eventually released to theaters by United Artists.

Theme music 
Henry Mancini composed "The Pink Panther Theme" for the live action films, which would be used extensively in the cartoon series as well. Doug Goodwin composed the show's opening title music while William Lava and Walter Greene composed music scores heard throughout the cartoons, many of which were variations on Mancini's "Pink Panther Theme".

Laugh track 
By the time of the show's 1969 debut, fitting cartoon and children's shows with a laugh track was standard practice. In keeping with this standard, NBC added a laugh track to all seasons of The Pink Panther Show, marking the first time in history that theatrical films were fitted with a laugh track for television broadcast (Season 2 utilized an inferior laugh track, utilizing isolated laugh clips from Season 1). This was an anomaly, as other theatrical cartoon series that were aired successfully on television (i.e. Tom and Jerry, Woody Woodpecker, Looney Tunes, Popeye) did not receive this addition.

The soundtracks were restored to their original theatrical form in 1982 when the DFE theatrical package went into syndication. Repackaging over the years has resulted in both theatrical and television versions of the entries being available. The exceptions were Misterjaw and Crazylegs Crane, which were produced specifically for television and never re-released theatrically, resulting in laughter-only versions. The U.S.-based Boomerang occasionally airs versions with the laugh track intact, though these versions are more commonly found outside of the U.S. The Spanish language Boomerang requires that MGM supply them with laugh track-only versions of all shorts. The Portuguese language Boomerang, France-based Gulli, and Poland channels TV 4 and TV6 also broadcast certain entries utilizing laugh track versions.

Incarnations 
Over its 10 years on various television networks, The Pink Panther Show had a variety of names:
 The Pink Panther Show (1969–1970, also considered the umbrella title of the series)
 The New Pink Panther Show (1971–1974)
 The Pink Panther and Friends (1974–1976)
 It's the All New Pink Panther Laugh-and-a-Half Hour-and-a-Half Show Introducing Misterjaw (1976–1977)
 Think Pink Panther (1977–1978)
 The All New Pink Panther Show (1978–1979)
 Pink Panther Encore (1979–1980)
 The Pink Panther Show (1980, Syndicated)

Syndication 
United Artists Television syndicated The Pink Panther Show in 1980, complete with bumpers and laugh-tracked versions of the shorts. By 1982, MGM Television began syndicating some individual cartoons to local stations to air them as they saw fit. This format did not contain the series' bumpers nor the laugh track.

The following series were included in MGM Television's syndication package:
 The Pink Panther
 The Inspector
 The Ant and the Aardvark
 Tijuana Toads/Texas Toads
 Misterjaw (made-for-television series)

The following series were not included in the MGM Television distribution package:
 Roland and Rattfink
 The Blue Racer
 Hoot Kloot
 The Dogfather
 Crazylegs Crane (made-for-television series)
Most television stations aired the later package released in 1982, featuring the cartoon shorts by themselves, isolated from the show's original bumpers sequences. The laugh track was also silenced on all entries except for Misterjaw. Chicago-based WGN-TV was one of the few stations to air the 1980 The Pink Panther Show syndication package. Conversely, New York City-based WPIX featured a stripped-down version of the shorts, airing the entries without the laugh track, bumpers, or theatrical opening/closing credits.

Reruns 
The Pink Panther Show (1969–1971) and The New Pink Panther Show (1971–1974) has been remastered in its original format. It was previously shown on BBC Two, UK Gold, BBC One, Boomerang (2000–2009) and Cartoon Network (1993–2002). In the late 2000s, it aired in Canada on Teletoon Retro weekday mornings at 8:00am. Teletoon Retro showed all 32 episodes of The Pink Panther Show with the panther and the Inspector, all 17 episodes of The New Pink Panther Show with the panther and the Ant and the Aardvark, and select episodes of the first syndicated Pink Panther Show series (only those episodes with the middle cartoon being an Ant and Aardvark). Teletoon Retro then showed all 16 episodes of The All New Pink Panther Show, with the panther and Crazylegs Crane. The laugh track is muted for most entries.

The episodes shown on Teletoon Retro also featured remastered versions, while the wrap-around content was in rougher condition. The Inspector cartoon, Tour de Farce, had the wrong title card, that for Reaux, Reaux, Reaux Your Boat.

Cartoon Network reran The Pink Panther Show from 1997 to 1999, and intermittently in 2006, 2009, and 2012. A "no-frills" version aired on Boomerang five days a week at 5:30am, 10am and 2:30pm; the Boomerang version included four shorts and no bumpers, in the style of its other theatrical-short compilation shows. Until August 2009, Boomerang only featured shorts from The Pink Panther, The Ant and the Aardvark and The Inspector. The laugh track was present on several entries. Currently, the show remains intact on the Spanish Language Boomerang TV channel with most entries containing their original laugh track. The Pink Panther show aired on Boomerang from 2004 to 2012.
In the Arab world, it was shown on Spacetoon from 2014 to 2017, due to Spacetoon airing The Pink Panther and low reception from Spacetoon viewers.

The show also previously aired in its original format on This TV on Tuesdays and Thursdays at 8:30am Eastern Time (as part of its Cookie Jar Toons programming block) until September 22, 2011. The digital broadcast network Light TV ran the series when the network launched Christmas weekend 2016 until September 29, 2019. On June 1, 2020 to May 29, 2022, the show aired for the first time in Spanish on Galavisión, known as El show de la Pantera Rosa.

MeTV currently reruns the show under the name Pink Panther's Party, during their Saturday morning block, Saturday Morning Cartoons, from 7:30 am to 8:00 am ET/ 6:30 to 7:00 am CT following Popeye and Pals, which currently airs from 7:00 am to 7:30 am ET/ 6:00 am to 6:30 am CT. The show is collectively called Popeye and Pink Panther's Party, combining Popeye and Pals and Pink Panther's Party into a single show.

Cast 
 Rich Little as Pink Panther
 Daws Butler as Pug, Louie
 John Byner as Charlie Ant, Blue Aardvark
 Larry D. Mann as Blue Racer, Crazylegs Crane
 Frank Welker as Crazylegs Crane Jr., Dragonfly
 Paul Frees as Narrator, Texan hunter, The Commissioner
 Don Diamond as Toro
  Tom Holland as Pancho
 Pat Harrington, Jr. as The Inspector, Sergeant Deux-Deux
 Bob Holt as Hoot Kloot, Hoot Kloot's Horse, Dogfather
 Arte Johnson as Misterjaw
 Bob Ogle as Harry Halibut
 Arnold Stang as Catfish
 Lennie Weinrib as Roland, Rattfink
 Paul Winchell as Fearless Freddy
 Don Messick as Sergeant Deux-Deux

Series overview

The Pink Panther Show (1969–1970) 
The first season of The Pink Panther Show (1969–1970) consisted of one The Inspector entry sandwiched by two Pink Panther entries. The show was "hosted" by The Pink Panther and The Inspector, seen during the opening sequence, which showed a boy driving the Panthermobile from the countryside to Grauman's Chinese Theatre in Hollywood. During the journey, images of animals mentioned in the song (rhinoceros, tiger, cats, American mink) are seen alongside clips of the panther from Reel Pink, Come On In! The Water's Pink and Put Put Pink. Upon arrival, the Pink Panther and the Inspector then disembark from the Panthermobile and enter the famous theatre. In the ending credits, the Inspector climbs back into the Panthermobile, but leaves the Pink Panther behind, who is seen chasing after the car.

The entries utilized for the second season featured complete original theatrical titles. With only two exceptions, the first and third cartoons of each episode were Pink Panthers, and second was an Inspector. In the two exceptions, the first and third cartoons were Inspectors, and the middle one was a Pink Panther. Unlike Season 1, a full laugh track was not used but rather an abridged version using isolated laughs from Season 1 edited onto the soundtrack by DFE (these inferior versions currently in circulation are marked with †). Seasons 1 and 2 were repackaged as a single Season 1 in the 2000s.

Season 1 (1969–1970)

Season 2 (1970–1971)

The New Pink Panther Show (1971–1974) 
The New Pink Panther Show (1971–1974) featured a new opening and closing sequence and theme song, pitting the attention-seeking Aardvark against the panther. The show's new title song, "Pantherly Pride", was written by Doug Goodwin and played over the opening sequence.

This incarnation aired The Ant and the Aardvark during the 1971–1972 season. Later seasons swapped The Ant and the Aardvark with theatrical series' Roland and Rattfink, Hoot Kloot or The Blue Racer, as well as reruns of The Inspector. Only eight new Pink Panther cartoons were produced over this three-year period (in Bold).

The Pink Panther and Friends (1974–1976) 
The Pink Panther and Friends (1974–1976) followed the same format as The New Pink Panther Show. The first Pink Panther entry was a new episode, while the second was a rebroadcast of an old entry. Bumpers featuring The Inspector and The Ant and the Aardvark connected the three entries. New series The Dogfather (originally produced for theatrical release) was also added to broadcasts, in addition to The Blue Racer or Hoot Kloot.

The Pink Panther Laugh-and-a-Half Hour-and-a-Half Show (1976–1977) 
The Pink Panther Laugh-and-a-Half Hour-and-a-Half Show was an attempt by DFE to revamp the traditional format of three entries airing in a 30-minute format. The show was expanded to 90 minutes, and included a live-action segment featuring comedian Lenny Schultz reading letters and jokes from viewers. The show also featured two new made-for-television series, a first for the franchise: the Texas Toads (a redubbed version of the theatrical Tijuana Toads series), and Misterjaw. New bumper sequences featuring both the Texas Toads and Misterjaw were created for the series. These new entries were aired in combination with rebroadcasts of The Pink Panther, The Inspector and The Ant and the Aardvark.

The Pink Panther Laugh-and-a-Half Hour-and-a-Half Show did not do well in the ratings, so it lasted only one season.

Think Pink Panther (1977–1978) 
The final series broadcast on NBC, Think Pink Panther reverted to the traditional 30-minute format and consisted of rebroadcasts. No new cartoons were created for this show. The layout of the closing credits was based on The New Pink Panther Show.

The All New Pink Panther Show (1978) 
The All New Pink Panther Show (1978) was a new version of the series commenced after NBC's broadcast of the series ended its nine-year run. For its tenth season, ABC picked up the series and requested 32 new made-for-television Pink Panther shorts, along with 16 entries for the new Crazylegs Crane segment. A disco-flavored rendition of Henry Mancini's "Pink Panther Theme" was used for the opening and closing credits, with the closing credits featuring Pink Panther disco-dancing. "Stay Tuned" bumpers were produced for seven episodes as well.

Pink Panther Encore (1979–1980) 
For its 11th and final season, DFE repackaged pre-1978 entries for a total of 52 episodes. No new cartoons were created for this show.

The Pink Panther Show (1980, syndicated) 
United Artists Television syndicated a weekday 30-minute Pink Panther show in 1980, complete with bumpers and laugh-tracked versions of the shorts. A new opening sequence preceding the show featured Henry Mancini's "Pink Panther Theme" played under a segment from Pink Outs featuring the Pink Panther folding the backdrop into a square to be eaten. The closer featured the last few seconds of the theme played under a scene from Reel Pink featuring the panther water skiing.

UATV created two versions of the syndication package. The first consisted of The Pink Panther, Inspector, The Ant and the Aardvark and Texas Toads entries sourced from film elements utilized during the program's original network run.

The second version consisted of The Pink Panther, The Ant and the Aardvark and Misterjaw entries sourced from new prints of the original film negatives and transferred to videotape, resulting in sharper images. As The Pink Panther and The Ant and the Aardvark entries were sourced using theatrical prints (sans laugh track), a new, less invasive laugh track being employed on sitcoms at the time was added to the soundtrack for consistency to match the made-for-television Misterjaw entries and bumper sequences that retained their respective laugh-tracked soundtracks.

The second version also incorporated several of the made-for-television Pink Panther entries from The All New Pink Panther Show. Pre-1978 Pink Panther and Ant and the Aardvark entries featured shorter opening titles with introduction music from either The New Pink Panther Show (1971–1974) or The All New Pink Panther Show (1978–1979). Closing credits featuring the Pink Panther disco dancing from The All New Pink Panther Show closed out the episodes.

Version 1

Version 2

Spanish versions 
Other versions of The Pink Panther Show have been seen and aired only in Spanish.

See also 
 List of The Pink Panther cartoons
 Laugh track

References

External links 
 
 
 Charles Brubaker's DePatie-Freleng Website

 
1969 American television series debuts
1980 American television series endings
1960s American animated television series
1970s American animated television series
1980s American animated television series
1960s American anthology television series
1970s American anthology television series
1980s American anthology television series
American children's animated anthology television series
American children's animated comedy television series
American television series with live action and animation
Animated television series about mammals
English-language television shows
Television series by DePatie–Freleng Enterprises
Television series by United Artists Television